Early Start is an American news morning television show on CNN and also broadcast on CNN International. It premiered on January 2, 2012. Anchored by Christine Romans since 2014, the program airs weekdays from 5:00-6:00 a.m. ET.

History
By the end of its run in 2011, CNN's American Morning had fallen behind in the morning ratings. Executive vice president Ken Jautz, who joined in September 2010, decided to revamp the network's morning lineup by canceling the show altogether and replacing it with two new programs less focused on national politics than cable rivals Fox & Friends and Morning Joe.

Along with Starting Point, Early Start replaced American Morning, which aired from 2001 to 2011. Ashleigh Banfield, who co-anchored with Sambolin until July 13, 2012, has since moved to the 12pm timeslot.

The new morning lineup was announced in November 2011 with Ashleigh Banfield and Zoraida Sambolin confirmed as anchors of the 5-7 a.m. program, while Soledad O'Brien joined as anchor of the 7-9 a.m. program. Banfield joined from ABC News while Sambolin was hired from WMAQ-TV. The name of the 5-7 a.m. program was announced as Early Start on Twitter on December 29. The program was subtitled News From A to Z, a reference to the first initials of the show's original co-anchors. On May 30, 2012, CNN announced ABC's John Berman would join Banfield and Sambolin as co-anchor. On June 26, 2012, CNN announced Banfield was leaving Early Start in July to anchor the 11am hour of CNN Newsroom. On December 13, 2013, Zoraida Sambolin left the show and was replaced by Christine Romans in January 2014.

There was also a weekend broadcast from 6-7 a.m. ET, and was alternated between Poppy Harlow, Miguel Marquez, Alison Kosik, Randi Kaye and Victor Blackwell. It merely served as a lead-in to the subsequent five-hour CNN Newsroom, both anchored by the same host or duo. On June 22, 2013, due to the launch of New Day, it was decided that Weekend Early Start would be cancelled in favor of New Day Saturday and New Day Sunday, which would respectively run for 3½ and 3 hours on their respective days. First weekend edition of New Day aired on that same day. Early Start continues on weekdays.

One week leading up to the 2016 United States presidential election, Early Start ran from 3am to 5am ET, followed by an extended version of New Day from 5am to 9am ET. This schedule then becomes a standard for CNN during breaking news events.

In January 2017, John Berman left the program to anchor CNN Newsroom at 9am ET. CNN announced Dave Briggs, formerly of NBC Sports and Fox News, would succeed him. In December 2019, Briggs signed off from co-hosting the program. The next month, in January 2020, Laura Jarrett became the new co-host.

In mid-2020 the program was reduced in length and now runs for one hour, starting at 5am ET.

On July 1, 2022, Laura Jarrett co-anchored Early Start for the last time before having a baby, leaving Romans as the program's sole host.

Notable moments
On the January 9, 2012 edition of the show, Banfield and Sambolin attempted to call comedian Chuck Nice as part of the "Wake 'Em Up" segment. Instead, the show dialed the wrong number and woke up an unknown man. The episode was skewered by Jon Stewart on The Daily Show, who also mocked the format of the segment.

On-air staff
Ashleigh Banfield (January 2 – July 13, 2012)
Rob Marciano (January 2 – December 21, 2012)
Zoraida Sambolin (January 2, 2012 – December 13, 2013)
John Berman (July 17, 2012 – February 16, 2017)
 Christine Romans (January 2014 – present)
 Dave Briggs (February 18, 2017 – December 20, 2019)
 Laura Jarrett (January 2, 2020 – July 1, 2022)

Recurring segments
CNN Business Now (formerly CNN Money Stream): The latest business headlines from CNN Business
The Bleacher Report: A round-up of sports news at approximately 20 past the hour
3 questions in 3 minutes: In which each journalist answers three political questions in three minutes

References

External links

2012 American television series debuts
2010s American television news shows
2020s American television news shows
CNN original programming
English-language television shows